Jesús Alfaro Ligero (born 24 June 1991) is a Spanish professional footballer who plays for CD Badajoz as a winger.

Club career
Born in La Palma del Condado, Huelva, Andalusia, Alfaro was a Sevilla FC youth graduate. He made his senior debut with the reserves on 3 January 2010, starting in a 0–0 Segunda División B home draw against Marbella FC.

On 3 January 2013, after only sparingly for the B-side in the following years, Alfaro terminated his contract and immediately joined fellow third division club Arroyo CP. He remained in the category in the following four seasons, representing Algeciras CF, CD Alcoyano and FC Barcelona B, achieving promotion to Segunda División with the latter in 2017.

Alfaro made his professional team debut on 28 August 2017, coming on as a substitute for Ferrán Sarsanedas in an 0–3 home loss against CD Tenerife. The following 17 January, he signed a two-and-a-half-year contract with fellow second division side Real Zaragoza.

On 8 August 2018, Alfaro was loaned to third division club Real Murcia for the season. The following January, he moved to Hércules CF also in a temporary deal, before signing a permanent contract with the latter club on 11 July 2019.

Personal life
Alfaro's two brothers are also footballers: Juan José (1981), a midfielder, graduated in FC Barcelona's La Masia, but spent his entire career in Segunda División B or lower. Winger Alejandro (1986) appeared several seasons for Sevilla B, after emerging through the club's youth ranks.

References

External links
FC Barcelona official profile

1991 births
Living people
Spanish footballers
Footballers from Andalusia
Sportspeople from the Province of Huelva
Association football wingers
Segunda División players
Segunda División B players
Tercera División players
Sevilla Atlético players
Sevilla FC C players
Algeciras CF footballers
CD Alcoyano footballers
FC Barcelona Atlètic players
Real Zaragoza players
Real Murcia players
Hércules CF players